Pius Ochieng (born 20 July 1960) is a Kenyan weightlifter. He competed at the 1984 Summer Olympics and the 1988 Summer Olympics.

References

1960 births
Living people
Kenyan male weightlifters
Olympic weightlifters of Kenya
Weightlifters at the 1984 Summer Olympics
Weightlifters at the 1988 Summer Olympics
Place of birth missing (living people)